Lady Irwin College is a constituent college of the University of Delhi. Established in 1932, it is a women's college located in New Delhi, India, and offers graduate courses in Food Technology as well as graduate and post-graduate courses in Home Science.

History
In 1928, the All India Women's Conference began to raise funds for the college. The college has an illustrious ancestry and was established under the patronage of Lady Dorothy Irwin, wife of Lord Irwin, Viceroy of India and the Maharanis of Baroda and Bhopal, Sarojini Naidu, Rajkumari Amrit Kaur, Annie Besant, Kamala Devi Chattopadhyay, Margaret Cousins and Sir Ganga Ram Kaula to name a few in 1931.

The buildings of the college campus have been classified and protected as heritage sites.

The college shifted to its current campus at Sikandra Road in 1938. Till 1950, it was managed by the All India Women's Education Fund Association, after which it got affiliated to the University of Delhi, and honours degree courses were introduced in the college.

Motto
The aphorism "Vidya Hi Seva" is read beneath the crest of the College emblem.
During the pre-independence period, along with Lady Dorothy Irwin, Mahatma Gandhi and Rajkumari Amrit Kaur were amongst the other revolutionists who participated in the struggle by the way of emancipation of women. The college came up in 1931, but during the course of developments, Rajkumari Amrit Kaur and M.K. Gandhi exchanged letters over the finalisation of the motto for the emblem. Discussing how "knowledge itself is service" against "service itself is knowledge", Gandhi gave a green signal for the previous one. The teaching learning transactions true to the motto, endeavour to inculcate a sense of knowledge to serve through carefully designed outreach experiences.

Courses
 B.Sc. (Pass) Home Science - 3-year degree course.
 B.Sc. (Honors) Home Science - 3-year degree course.
 B.Ed (Home Science) -2 year degree course
 B.Ed. Special Education (MR) - 1-year degree course.
 Btech. Food technology
 Post Graduate Diploma in Dietetics & Public Health Nutrition - 1-year diploma course
 M.Sc. Home Science - 2-year degree course in:
 Food & Nutrition
 Human Development & Childhood Studies
Fabric and Apparel Science
Development Communication & Extension
Resource Management & Design Application
 Ph.D. - In all five specialisations of Home Science

Rankings
It is ranked 16th across India by National Institutional Ranking Framework in 2022.

Alumni
 Manpreet Brar, model and Miss India 1995
 Shyamala Gopalan, Indian-American cancer researcher (mother of Kamala Harris)
 Ritu Kumar, fashion designer 
 Suniya S. Luthar, Professor Emerita at Teachers College Columbia University 
 Thangam Philip, Padma Shri civilian award winner
 Sushma Seth, actor and founder Yatrik Theatre Group 
 Chitrangada Singh, actor

See also
Education in India
Literacy in India
List of institutions of higher education in Delhi

References

External links
 

Educational institutions established in 1932
Universities and colleges in Delhi
Delhi University
Women's universities and colleges in Delhi
1932 establishments in British India